This list of abalone synonyms is a list of scientific names that have been given to abalone species worldwide. Carl Linnaeus described the type species Haliotis asinina in 1758, and over the centuries a large number of additional species of abalone were named using the proper scientific process for naming a species. In addition, some subspecies, forms, and varieties were also named. However, many of these names subsequently proved to be synonyms of species that had already been named. The following is a list of what are, in 2014, considered to be valid species and subspecies, with the synonyms listed beside them.

Synonyms of species
The following species have been brought into synonymy:

Footnotes

References
 
 

Haliotidae